Threonyl-tRNA synthetase, cytoplasmic is an enzyme that in humans is encoded by the TARS gene.

Aminoacyl tRNA synthetases catalyze the aminoacylation of tRNA by their cognate amino acid. Because of their central role in linking amino acids with nucleotide triplets contained in tRNAs, aminoacyl-tRNA synthetases are thought to be among the first proteins that appeared in evolution. Threonyl-tRNA synthetase belongs to the class-II aminoacyl-tRNA synthetase family

See also
 Aminoacyl tRNA synthetase

References

Further reading